Kelley Fox (born 1968) is an American Paralympic alpine skier. She represented the United States in Paralympic Alpine skiing at the 1994 Paralympic Winter Games in Lillehammer. She won two silver medals.

Career 
At the 1994 Winter Paralympics, in Lillehammer, Norway, Fox finished 2nd in the slalom LWX-XII, with a time of 2: 27.24, behind of her compatriot Sarah Will, who won gold in 2:14.56 and in front of Swiss Vreni Stoeckli, who won bronze in 2:40.71. Fox finished second, winning the silver medal, with a time of 1: 34.55, in the downhill LWX-XII. On the podium, in 1st place, was Sarah Will (in 1: 30.46) and in 3rd place the German Gerda Pamler (in 1:34.55).

She competed at the 1996 Para-alpine World Championships in Lech, Austria, winning a gold medal.

She competed at the 2016 Adaptive Spirit race.

References 

1968 births
Living people
Skiers from Denver
Paralympic alpine skiers of the United States
American female alpine skiers
Paralympic silver medalists for the United States
Alpine skiers at the 1994 Winter Paralympics
Medalists at the 1994 Winter Paralympics